"Bertie Takes Gussie's Place At Deverill Hall" is the fourth episode of the third series of the 1990s British comedy television series Jeeves and Wooster. It is also called "Right Ho! Jeeves".

In the US, it was aired as the second episode of the second series of Jeeves and Wooster on Masterpiece Theatre, on 3 January 1993. "The Ties That Bind" aired as the fourth episode of the third series instead.

Background 
Adapted from The Mating Season.

Cast 
 Bertie Wooster – Hugh Laurie
 Jeeves – Stephen Fry 
 Aunt Agatha – Mary Wimbush 
 Gussie Fink-Nottle – Richard Braine 
 Madeline Bassett – Elizabeth Morton 
 Gertrude – Chloë Annett 
 Dame Daphne Winkworth – Rosalind Knight 
 Emmeline – Hilary Sesta 
 Harriet – Harriet Reynolds 
 Myrtle – Celia Gore-Booth 
 Charlotte – Sheila Mitchell 
 Catsmeat – John Elmes 
 Hilda – Harriet Bagnall
 Magistrate – Llewellyn Rees

Plot 
Gussie Fink-Nottle is to visit Deverill Hall but gets drunk and ends up sentenced to 14 days in jail. Bertie is also due there, where Aunt Agatha is trying to match him up with Gertrude Winkworth. So that Gussie doesn't get in trouble, Bertie turns up pretending to be him, but then Gussie turns up too (having just been fined) with Jeeves posing as his valet. Gussie pretends to be Bertie and woos Gertrude successfully. Meanwhile, Catsmeat Potter-Pirbright, who is in love with Gertrude, appears (he has been rejected by the fierce Dame Daphne Winkworth and her four sisters), pretending to be Bertie's valet. When it seems that things can't get any worse, Aunt Agatha and Gussie's girlfriend Madeline Bassett turn up.

See also
 List of Jeeves and Wooster characters

References

External links
 

Jeeves and Wooster episodes
1992 British television episodes